The large pencil-tailed tree mouse or greater pencil-tailed tree mouse (Chiropodomys major) is a species of arboreal rodent in the family Muridae. It is endemic to Borneo where it is only known from Sabah and Sarawak (Malaysia), although it is likely to also occur in Kalimantan.

References

Chiropodomys
Mammals described in 1893
Taxa named by Oldfield Thomas
Endemic fauna of Malaysia
Rodents of Malaysia
Endemic fauna of Borneo
Mammals of Borneo
Taxonomy articles created by Polbot